This is a list of places in the ceremonial county of Buckinghamshire, England.  It does not include places which were formerly in Buckinghamshire.  For places which were in Buckinghamshire until 1974, and were then transferred to Berkshire, and other places transferred from Buckinghamshire since 1844, see list of Buckinghamshire boundary changes.

A

Note: Population normally available for civil parishes, unavailable for constituent villages and hamlets

B

Note: Population normally available for civil parishes, unavailable for constituent villages and hamlets

C

Note: Population normally available for civil parishes, unavailable for constituent villages and hamlets

D

Note: Population normally available for civil parishes, unavailable for constituent villages and hamlets

E

Note: Population normally available for civil parishes, unavailable for constituent villages and hamlets

F

Note: Population normally available for civil parishes, unavailable for constituent villages and hamlets

G

Note: Population normally available for civil parishes, unavailable for constituent villages and hamlets

H

Note: Population normally available for civil parishes, unavailable for constituent villages and hamlets

I

Note: Population normally available for civil parishes, unavailable for constituent villages and hamlets

J

K

Note: Population normally available for civil parishes, unavailable for constituent villages and hamlets

L

Note: Population normally available for civil parishes, unavailable for constituent villages and hamlets

M

Note: Population normally available for civil parishes, unavailable for constituent villages and hamlets

N

Note: Population normally available for civil parishes, unavailable for constituent villages and hamlets

O

Note: Population data unavailable for hamlets

P

Note: Population normally available for civil parishes, unavailable for constituent villages and hamlets

Q

Note: Population normally available for civil parishes, unavailable for constituent villages and hamlets

R

Note: Population normally available for civil parishes, unavailable for constituent villages and hamlets

S

Note: Population normally available for civil parishes, unavailable for constituent villages and hamlets

T

Note: Population normally available for civil parishes, unavailable for constituent villages and hamlets

U

Note: Population normally available for civil parishes, unavailable for constituent villages and hamlets

V

Note: Population normally available for civil parishes, unavailable for constituent villages and hamlets

W

Note: Population normally available for civil parishes, unavailable for constituent villages and hamlets

Former settlements
Flaunden village was moved in the early 19th century across the county boundary and into Hertfordshire.

Towersey village was transferred to Oxfordshire in 1933, when the county boundary was moved.

Slough, Eton and Datchet were transferred to Berkshire in 1974, when the north eastern corner of the country boundary was moved a few miles northwards.

See also
 List of Buckinghamshire boundary changes
 Places of interest in Buckinghamshire
 List of civil parishes in Buckinghamshire
 List of places in England

References

 
 
 
 
Buckinghamshire